Empress Dowager Xiaochun (1588–1615), of the Liu clan, was a Ming dynasty concubine  of the Taichang Emperor and biological mother of the Chongzhen Emperor.

Biography
Lady Liu became a concubine of Zhu Changluo when he was the crown prince. She was of the rank lady, a low-level concubine. 

In February 1611, Lady Liu gave birth to a son named Zhu Youjian. In 1614, her husband became infuriated with Lady Liu and ordered that she be punished, at which point Lady Liu was killed. It is debated whether the crown prince ordered Lady Liu's death, or it occurred accidentally while she was being disciplined.

Legacy
Fearing reproachment for Lady Liu's death from his father, as well as the spirits and ancestors, the crown prince forbade the palace staff from mentioning the affair and had Lady Liu buried in the Western Hills near Beijing. 

On the succession of the Tianqi Emperor in 1620, Zhu Youjian was given the title Prince of Xin (信王) and Lady Liu was posthumously awarded the title Consort Xian. During this time, Zhu Youjian uncovered the location of his mother's resting place from his attendants. 

When Zhu Youjian succeeded to the imperial throne as the Chongzhen Emperor in 1627, he granted his mother the posthumous title of Empress Dowager Xiaochun gongyi shumu zhuangjing pitian yusheng. The Chongzhen Emperor also moved her tomb to Qingling to be buried alongside her husband.

Portrait
As the Chongzhen Emperor had been only five years old at the time of her death, he requested that someone obtain a portrait of his mother for him. Consort Yi had been a concubine of the Taichang Emperor along with Lady Liu when he was crown prince and had lived in a palace close to her. Consort Yi found a palace attendant who looked similar to Lady Liu and ordered her mother, Esteemed Lady Xu of the State of Ying (灜國太夫人徐氏), to oversee the project. On its completion, the portrait was brought through Zhengyang Gate. The emperor knelt to greet the portrait and it was hung in the palace. Old servants were summoned and asked if the portrait resembled Lady Liu, after which the emperor and all in attendance wept.

Titles
During the reign of the Wanli Emperor (r. 1572–1620):
Lady Liu (劉氏; from 1588)
Lady of Gentleness (淑女)
During the reign of the Tianqi Emperor (r.1620–1627):
Consort Xian (賢妃; from 1621)
During the reign of the Chongzhen Emperor (r. 1627–1644):
Empress Dowager Xiàochún Gōngyì Shūmù Zhuāngjìng Pítiān Yùshèng (孝純恭懿淑穆莊靜毘天毓聖皇太后; from 1627)

Issue
As Lady of Gentleness: 
Zhu Youjian, the Chongzhen Emperor (崇禎帝 朱由檢; 6 February 1611 – 25 April 1644), the Taichang Emperor's fifth son

References

Notes

Works cited

1580s births
1614 deaths
Ming dynasty imperial consorts
16th-century Chinese women
16th-century Chinese people
17th-century Chinese women
17th-century Chinese people
Murdered royalty
Ming dynasty posthumous empresses
People from Lianyungang